Čačvina Castle the ruins of medieval fortification near the town of Trilj in modern-day Croatia.

Čačvina fortification guarded approach from Bosnia during the wars with the Ottomans. Its strategic location enables its crew to oversee the traffic of goods through the mountain passage that goes through the Dinaric Alps and leads to Bosnia. First written record of fortification dates to 1345.

References

External links 

Castles in Croatia
Buildings and structures in Split-Dalmatia County